The Polyphem was a proposed light-weight fibre-optic wire-guided surface-to-surface missile with a range of 60 km.

It uses a sealed round, a solid propellant booster rocket to launch the missile out of its canister to an initial height, so that the wings and control surfaces can unfold, and a more fuel economic turbojet cruise engine kicks in to propel the missile.

The missile can be programmed to follow a preset course, using GPS or inertial guidance. An infrared seeker can be used to automatically pick a target and for the terminal guidance phase, but it is also possible to transfer the thermal images back to the launching platform via a 200 MBit/s data link provided by an optical fibre, and manually select the target.

The Polyphem program was started in 1994 by Germany, France and Italy. Italy later left the project.

A naval version, called Polyphem-S, was initially selected for the Braunschweig class corvette as anti-ship and land-attack missile, but that has been cancelled.

The Polyphem program as a whole was cancelled in 2003.

Polyphem is the German Name of Polyphemus, the cyclops in the Odyssey that got his eye stabbed out by Ulysses.

The system is roughly comparable to the Serbian ALAS missile.

Specifications
Speed: 120—180 m/s (around 430—650 km/h)
Range: up to 60 km
Altitude: 20 to 600 m above ground (variable)
Missile mass: around 130 kg
Length: 2.70 m
Warhead: up to 20 kg

See also
ALAS
CM-501G
FOG-MPM
MGM-157 EFOGM
XM501 Non-Line-of-Sight Launch System
Type 96 Multi-Purpose Missile System

Notes

References
 POLYPHEM - army-technology.com
 Striking possibility - Flight Global

Surface-to-surface missiles